Middlesboro–Bell County Airport,  is a city-owned public-use airport located  west of the central business district of Middlesboro, a city in Bell County, Kentucky, United States.

Although most airports in the United States use the same three-letter location identifier for the FAA and International Air Transport Association (IATA), this airport is assigned 1A6 by the FAA but has no designation from the IATA.

Facilities and aircraft 
It has one asphalt runway: 10/28 is 3,631 by 75 feet (1,107 x 23 m).

For the 12-month period ending August 27, 2015, the airport had 18,900 aircraft operations, an average of 52 per day: 89% general aviation, 9% air taxi and 2% military. In July 2018, there were 26 aircraft based at this airport: 16 single-engine, 2 multi-engine, 2 helicopter and 6 ultralight.

See also
 List of airports in Kentucky

References

External links 
 

Airports in Kentucky
Buildings and structures in Bell County, Kentucky
Transportation in Bell County, Kentucky